Grand-Béréby is a coastal town in south-western Ivory Coast. It is a sub-prefecture and commune of San-Pédro Department in San-Pédro Region, Bas-Sassandra District.

Grand-Béréby is located where the Néro river enters the Atlantic. A  unpaved airstrip serves the town.

Tourism 
The city is equipped with a resort, the La Baie des sirènes, the Ecolodge Le Kara Krou chez Gus, à Ménéké plage. 9km to Grand Béréby of easy track, overlooking the ocean and in the middle of nature is the Ecolodge Le Kara Krou, on the beach of Ménéké (Dahoua), managed by Gus the Italian.  Huge pristine beach, nesting place for sea turtles, the ecolodge is perfectly inserted in the surrounding nature, tenaciously protected by Gus who has been doing everything possible for about 10 years so that wild animals can find an ideal place and trees grow without problems.  To date no one hunts, no one cuts down the trees ... the food is genuine, everything comes from the ocean in front of the Kara Krou, fish of different species (groupers, red carp, broché, cobia etc. etc.), lobsters, crabs etc.  The fruit and vegetables all come from the back scrub, cultivated by the villagioies of Ménéké.  Bungalows for 12-14 people are currently available.  2 new bungalows for 4 more people will be ready soon. Kara Krou organizes canoe rides from the Dodo River to the ocean, traditional pirogue rides on the sacred lake and mangroves for a close exchange with monkeys and other activities.

The village of Boubélé, located 60 km to the west, in the direction of Tabou is specialized in sport fishing. Red carp, barracuda, mackerel, trevallies, skate, marlin and sharks abound in this area.

Notable people 
 Jean Michaël Seri (born 19 July 1991), is an Ivorian international footballer

In 2014, the population of the sub-prefecture of Grand-Béréby was 98,686.

Villages
The seventy four villages of the sub-prefecture of Grand-Béréby and their population in 2014 are:

References

Sub-prefectures of San-Pédro Region
Communes of San-Pédro Region